Tärnström is a Swedish surname.  People with the surname Tärnström include:

Christopher Tärnström (1711–1746), Swedish naturalist and Lutheran pastor
Dick Tärnström (born 1975), Swedish ice hockey defenceman and father of Oliver Tärnström
Oliver Tärnström (born 2002), Swedish ice hockey forward and son of Dick Tärnström